St Petersburg is a suburb in north-eastern Hamilton in New Zealand. In the 2013 census it was in meshblock  0951707, which was part of Sylvester area and had a population of 822 in 240 houses. In 2018 that meshblock was split into 4 meshblocks and is part of Flagstaff South. Others also describe it as part of Flagstaff. 

A 2012 photo shows Petersburg Drive without any housing.

At peak hours in school terms it is served by bus 4N, which started to run on 18 January 2016, and had increased services in 2017.

References

See also
 Suburbs of Hamilton, New Zealand

Suburbs of Hamilton, New Zealand